Unión Deportiva Almansa is a Spanish football team  based in Almansa, in the autonomous community of Castile-La Mancha. Founded in 1992 it plays in Tercera División – Group 18, holding home games at Polideportivo Municipal Paco Simón, with a capacity of 5,000 seats.

History
The first seasons in the Tercera división were not easy, except in the 1998–99 season when the club struggled to save the category.

Club names
Escuela de Fútbol Castillo de Almansa (1992–96).
Unión Deportiva Almansa (1996–).

Season to season

1 season in Segunda División B
17 seasons in Tercera División

Playoffs results

Current squad

References

External links
Official website 
Futbolme team profile 

Football clubs in Castilla–La Mancha
Association football clubs established in 1992
1992 establishments in Spain
Almansa